Menas of Samnium is a 6th-century hermit venerated as a saint in the Catholic Church. The primary source for details of his life is an account written by Pope Gregory the Great and also published in the sixth century.

Veneration 

The Catholic Church commemorates SAINT Menas on November 11 with an entry in the Roman Martyrology. The 2004 edition of the Martyrology reads: "In the province of Samnium, the commemoration of Saint Menas, hermit, whose virtues Pope Saint Gregory the Great commemorates." His entry in the 1956 edition of the Martyrology (representing the Tridentine tradition) is nearly identical.

Pope Gregory's account 

Pope Gregory the Great gives the following account of Menas's life in his Dialogues, published :

References 

Italian Roman Catholic saints
6th-century Christian saints
Italian hermits
6th-century Italian people